is a railway station on the Hokuriku Main Line in the city of Komatsu, Ishikawa, Japan, operated by West Japan Railway Company (JR West).

Lines
It is also scheduled to become a station on the high-speed Hokuriku Shinkansen line when the extension west of  opens around 2025.

Station layout
The station consists of one elevated island platform and one elevated side platform with the station building underneath. The station has a Midori no Madoguchi staffed ticket office.

Platforms

History
Komatsu Station opened on 20 September 1897. With the privatization of Japanese National Railways (JNR) on 1 April 1987, the station came under the control of JR West.

Construction of the platforms serving the Hokuriku Shinkansen was completed in August 2022.

Passenger statistics
In fiscal 2015, the station was used by an average of 4,002 passengers daily (boarding passengers only).

See also
 List of railway stations in Japan

References

External links

  

Stations of West Japan Railway Company
Railway stations in Ishikawa Prefecture
Railway stations in Japan opened in 1897
Hokuriku Main Line
Komatsu, Ishikawa